The volleyball tournament of NCAA Season 93 started on January 4, 2018 at the Filoil Flying V Arena in San Juan, Philippines. San Sebastian College – Recoletos (SSC–R) is the event host.

All teams will participate in an elimination round which is a single round robin tournament. The top four teams qualify in the semifinals, where the unbeaten team bounces through the finals, with a thrice-to-beat advantage, higher-seeded team possesses the twice-to-beat advantage, or qualify to the first round. The winners qualify to the finals.

Men's tournament

Elimination round

Team standings

Match-up results

Game results

Final round

First round

Semifinals

Finals

 Finals' Most Valuable Player: Rey Taneo Jr.
 Coach of the year: Sinfronio "Sammy" Acaylar

Awards
 Season Most Valuable Player: Joebert Almodiel
 Rookie of the Year: Joebert Almodiel
 1st Best Outside Spiker: Joebert Almodiel
 2nd Best Outside Spiker: Christian Dela Paz
 1st Best Middle Blocker: Kevin Liberato
 2nd Best Middle Blocker: Limuel Patenio
 Best Opposite Spiker: Mark Christian Encisco
 Best Setter: Warren Lewis Catipay
 Best Libero: Jack Kalingking

Women's tournament

Elimination round

Team standings

Match-up results

Game results

Final round

Semifinals
Arellano vs JRU Arellano with twice-to-beat advantage.

San Beda vs UPHD San Beda with twice-to-beat advantage.

Finals

 Finals' Most Valuable Player: Regine Anne Arocha
 Coach of the year: Roberto "Obet" Javier

Awards
 Season Most Valuable Player: Maria Shola May Alvarez
 Rookie of the Year: Necole Ebuen
 1st Best Outside Spiker: Jovielyn Grace Prado
 2nd Best Outside Spiker: Dolly Grace Verzosa
 1st Best Middle Blocker: Ma. Lourdes Clemente
 2nd Best Middle Blocker: Joyce Sta. Rita
 Best Opposite Spiker: Regine Anne Arocha
 Best Setter: Vira Guillema
 Best Libero: Alyssa Eroa

Juniors' tournament

Elimination round

Team standings

Match-up results

Game results

Final round

Fourth-seed playoff

Semifinals
EAC vs Letran EAC with twice-to-beat advantage.

Perpetual vs Arellano Perpetual with twice-to-beat advantage.

Finals

 Finals' Most Valuable Player: Jody Margaux Severo 
 Coach of the year: Sandy Rieta

Awards
 Season Most Valuable Player: Kirk Patrick Rosos
 Rookie of the Year: Arnel Christian Aguilar
 1st Best Outside Spiker: Noel Michael Kampton
 2nd Best Outside Spiker: Juvie Colonia
 1st Best Middle Blocker: Raliuz Joezer Cantos
 2nd Best Middle Blocker: Gideon James Guadalupe
 Best Opposite Spiker: John Paulo Lorenzo
 Best Setter: Michael Vince Imperial
 Best Libero: Raxel Redd Catris

See also
UAAP Season 80 volleyball tournaments

References

2018 in Philippine sport
2018 in volleyball
Volleyball in the Philippines